Chiavano is a frazione of the comune of Cascia in the Province of Perugia, Umbria, central Italy. It stands at an elevation of 1128 metres above sea level. At the time of the Istat census of 2001 it had 38 inhabitants.

References 

Frazioni of the Province of Perugia